"Drive" is a song by Australian musician Gretta Ray, released in August 2016 as the lead single from Ray's debut EP  Here and Now (2018).

In October 2016, the song won first place in the Vanda & Young Global Songwriting Competition.

References

2016 singles
2016 songs
Gretta Ray songs
Songs written by Gretta Ray
Vanda & Young Global Songwriting Competition Winning Songs